The Women's 100 metre freestyle swimming events for the 2020 Summer Paralympics took place at the Tokyo Aquatics Centre from 26 August to 3 September 2021. A total of seven events were contested over this distance.

Schedule

Medal summary
The following is a summary of the medals awarded across all 100 metre freestyle events.

Results
The following were the results of the finals only of each of the Women's 100 metre freestyle events in each of the classifications. Further details of each event, including where appropriate heats and semi finals results, are available on that event's dedicated page.

S3

The S3 category is for swimmers who have leg or arm amputations, have severe coordination problems in their limbs, or have to swim with their arms but don't use their trunk or legs.

The final in this classification took place on 30 August 2021:

S5

The S5 category is for swimmers who have hemiplegia, paraplegia or short stature.

The final in this classification took place on 26 August 2021:

S7

The S7 category is for swimmers who have one leg and one arm amputation on opposite side, or paralysis on one side of their body. These swimmers have full control of their arms and trunk but variable function in their legs.

The final in this classification took place on 31 August 2021:

S9

The S9 category is for swimmers who have joint restrictions in one leg, or double below-the-knee amputations.

The final in this classification took place on 31 August 2021:

S10

The S10 category is for swimmers who have minor physical impairments, for example, loss of one hand.

The final in this classification took place on 28 August 2021:

S11

The S11 category is for swimmers who have severe visual impairments and have very low or no light perception, such as blindness; they are required to wear blackened goggles to compete. They use tappers when competing in swimming events.

The final in this classification took place on 3 September 2021:

S12

The S12 category is for swimmers who have moderate visual impairment and have a visual field of less than 5 degrees radius. They are required to wear blackened goggles to compete. They may wish to use a tapper.

The final in this classification took place on 31 August 2021:

References

Swimming at the 2020 Summer Paralympics